Murru is a surname. Notable people with the surname include:

Marta Murru (born 2000), Italian synchronised swimmer
Nicola Murru (born 1994), Italian footballer